Karina Gauvin is a Canadian soprano who has made several recordings and is especially recognised for her interpretation of Baroque music. Opera News stated that, "Gauvin knows how to rivet an audience in opera and concert. She has been a queen of Baroque opera for years. Her personality is big enough to dominate her elaborate wigs and costumes, and her soprano voice is like a clear, refreshing and inexhaustible spring that darts and sparkles around any ornamental obstacle in its way."

Life and career
Born 1966 in Repentigny, Quebec Gauvin was the youngest of three children born to two both professionally trained opera singers who were never able to establish successful performance careers. With the encouragement of her mother, Lucie Gaudreau, she became a member of the Canadian Children's Opera Chorus at the age of 8. She sang in numerous concerts and operas with the chorus over the next eight years, including productions of Tosca and Wozzeck. As a teenager she began to study singing seriously with mezzo-soprano Catherine Robbin in Toronto. She moved with her family back to Montreal and shortly thereafter enrolled at McGill University where she majored in Art History. While there she sang in the university's chorus under conductor Nicole Paiement. Paiement convinced Gauvin to pursue a career as a singer, and she subsequently left McGill for the Conservatoire de musique du Québec à Montréal where she became a pupil of Marie Daveluy. She later studied in Glasgow with contralto Pamela Bowden  at the Royal Scottish Academy of Music and Drama.

Gauvin made her professional opera debut with the Glimmerglass Opera. She won First Prize at the CBC Radio National Competition, and the Lieder Prize and the Public's Prize at the 's-Hertogenbosch International Vocal Competition (Holland, 1994). Other awards include the Virginia Parker Prize (Canada Council) and the Maggie Teyte Memorial Prize in London. She has sung in concerts with the Chicago Symphony, Les Violons du Roy, Los Angeles Philharmonic, Minnesota Orchestra, Montreal Symphony Orchestra, Orchestre Symphonique de Québec, Philadelphia Orchestra, Tafelmusik Baroque Orchestra and Toronto Symphony Orchestra among others.

References
Citations

External links
 Karina Gauvin’s official website (Flash required)

1966 births
Living people
People from Repentigny, Quebec
Conservatoire de musique du Québec à Montréal alumni
Canadian operatic sopranos
Singers from Quebec
Juno Award for Classical Album of the Year – Vocal or Choral Performance winners
Canadian performers of early music
Women performers of early music
20th-century Canadian women opera singers
21st-century Canadian women opera singers